Tourism in Indonesia is an important component of the Indonesian economy as well as a significant source of its foreign exchange revenues. Indonesia was ranked at 20th in the world tourist Industry in 2017, also ranked as the ninth-fastest growing tourist sector in the world, the third-fastest growing in Asia and fastest-growing in Southeast Asia. In 2018, Denpasar, Jakarta and Batam are among of 10 cities in the world with fastest growth in tourism, 32.7, 29.2 and 23.3 percent respectively. The tourism sector ranked as the 4th largest among goods and services export sectors.

On 2019, Indonesia recorded 16.10 million foreign tourist arrivals, seeing a 1.9% per cent increase than that of 2018. In 2015, 9.73 million international visitors entered Indonesia, staying in hotels for an average of 7.5 nights and spending an average of US$1,142 per person during their visit, or US$152.22 per person per day. Singapore, Malaysia, China, Australia, and Japan are the top five sources of visitors to Indonesia.

The Travel and Tourism Competitiveness Report 2019 ranks Indonesia 40th out of 140 countries overall with Travel and Tourism Competitiveness Index score of 4.3. It is a two steps improvement from Indonesia's 2017 position of 42nd out of 136 countries overall with index score of 4.2. The 2015 report ranks the price competitiveness of Indonesia's tourism sector the 3rd out of 141 countries. It mentions that Indonesia has quite good travel and tourism policy and enabling conditions (ranked 9th). The country also scores quite good on natural and cultural resources (ranked 17th). However, the country scored rather low in infrastructure sub-index (ranked 75th), as some aspect of tourist service infrastructure are underdeveloped.

In 2016, the government was reported to be investing more in tourism development by attracting more foreign investors. The government has given priority to 10 destinations as follows: Borobudur, Central Java; Mandalika, West Nusa Tenggara; Labuan Bajo, East Nusa Tenggara; Bromo-Tengger-Semeru, East Java; Thousand Islands, Jakarta; Toba, North Sumatra; Wakatobi, Southeast Sulawesi; Tanjung Lesung, Banten; Morotai, North Maluku; and Tanjung Kelayang, Belitung. As quoted in The Jakarta Post, the government is aiming for 275 million trips by domestic tourists by end of 2019. The government has also secured commitments from potential investors, totalling US$70 million in the areas of building accommodation, marina and ecotourism facilities in 3 of the 10 areas. Indonesia is ranked at seventh place in the list of Lonely Planet's top 10 countries to visit in 2019. The country ranks fourth out of the top 25 destinations in the world in 2018 by travel site TripAdvisor.

Overview 

Both nature and culture are major components of Indonesian tourism. The natural heritage can boast a unique combination of a tropical climate, a vast archipelago of 17,508 islands, 6,000 of them being inhabited, the second longest shoreline in the world (54,716 km) after Canada. It is the world's largest and most populous country situated only on islands. The beaches in Bali, diving sites in Bunaken, Mount Bromo in East Java, Lake Toba and various national parks in Sumatra are just a few examples of popular scenic destinations.  These natural attractions are complemented by a rich cultural heritage that reflects Indonesia's dynamic history and ethnic diversity. One fact that exemplifies this richness is that 719 living languages are used across the archipelago. The ancient Prambanan and Borobudur temples, Toraja, Yogyakarta, Minangkabau, and of course Bali, with its many Hindu festivities, are some of the popular destinations for cultural tourism.

Indonesia is a member of PATA and was the host of its annual conference in 1963 and 1974 in Jakarta, and in 2003 in Bali. Indonesia also was the host of PATA Travel Mart in 1985 and 1989 in Bali, and 2016 in Jakarta.

Tourism in Indonesia is currently overseen by the Indonesian Ministry of Tourism. International tourism campaigns have been focusing largely on its tropical destinations with white sand beaches, blue sky, and cultural attractions. Beach resorts and hotels have been developed in some popular tourist destinations, especially Bali island as the primary destination. At the same time, the integration of cultural affairs and tourism under the scope of the same ministry shows that cultural tourism is considered an integral part of Indonesia's tourism industry, and conversely, that tourism is used to promote and preserve the cultural heritage.

Some of the challenges Indonesia's tourism industry has to face include the development of infrastructure to support tourism across the sprawling archipelago, incursions of the industry into local traditions (adat), and the impact of tourism development on the life of local people. The tourism industry in Indonesia has also faced setbacks due to problems related to security. Since 2002, warnings have been issued by some countries over terrorist threats and ethnic as well as religious conflicts in some areas, significantly reducing the number of foreign visitors for a few years. However, the number of international tourists has bounced back positively since 2007, and reached a new record in 2008 and kept rising since then.

The 2019 Travel and Tourism Competitiveness Report ranks Indonesia 40th out of 140 countries overall with a score of 4.3. It lists the price competitiveness of Indonesia's tourism sector the sixth out of 140 countries. The report states that Indonesia scores well on visa policy (#3) and international openness (#16), as well as on natural (#17) and cultural resources (#24). However, Indonesia has a low score in infrastructure (#98), as some aspects of tourist service infrastructure are underdeveloped. Other aspects that need to be improved include health and hygiene, environmental sustainability, and affinity for travel and tourism.

Historical context 

Indonesia seems to have been a travel destination for centuries. Some panels in Borobudur bas-reliefs depicted drink vendors, warungs (small restaurants), tavern or lodgings where people were drinking and dancing. The historical record of travel in Indonesia can be found since the 14th century. The Nagarakretagama reported that King Hayam Wuruk's royal travel throughout Majapahit realm in East Java had large numbers of carriages, accompanied by nobles, royal courtiers, officials and servants. Although it seems like a stately affair, in some instances the king's trip somewhat resembles a modern-day tour, as the king visited multiple modern tourism sites; from temples such as Palah and Jajawa, to enjoy the mountain scenery, having a bath in petirtaan (bathing pools) and going to the beach. The 15th-century travelogue of Bujangga Manik, a travelling Hindu scholar-priest from Pakuan Pajajaran, reported about his travel around Java and Bali. Although his travel was a pilgrimage one; visiting temples and sacred places in Java and Bali, sometimes he behaves like a modern-day tourist, such as sitting around fanning his body while enjoying beautiful mountain scenery in Puncak area, looking at Gede volcano that he describes as the highest point around Pakuan Pajajaran (capital of Sunda kingdom).

Initially the tourism, service and hospitality sector in Dutch East Indies were developed to cater the lodging, entertainment and leisure needs of domestic visitors, especially the wealthy Dutch plantation owners and merchants during their stay in the city. In the 19th century, colonial heritage hotels equipped with dance halls, live music and fine dining restaurants were established in Dutch East Indies urban areas, such as Hotel des Indes (est. 1829) in Batavia (now Jakarta), Savoy Homann Hotel (est. 1871) in Bandung, Hotel Oranje (est. 1910) in Surabaya, and Hotel De Boer in Medan. Since the 19th century Dutch East Indies has attracted visitors from The Netherlands. The first national tourism bureau was the Vereeniging Toeristen Verkeer, established by Governor-General of Dutch East Indies in early 20th century, and shared their head office in Batavia with Koninklijke Nederlansch Indische Luchtfahrt Maatschapijj (part of KLM) that began to fly from Amsterdam to Batavia in 1929. In 1913, Vereeneging Touristen Verkeer wrote a guide book about tourism places in the Indies. Since then Bali become known to international tourist with foreign tourist arrivals rose for more than 100% in 1927. Much of the international tourism of the 1920s and 1930s was by international visitors on oceanic cruises. The 1930s did see a modest but significant influx of mainly European tourists and long term stayers to Bali. Many came for the blossoming arts scene in the Ubud area, which was as much a two-way exchange between the Balinese and outsiders as it was an internal phenomenon.

Tourism more or less disappeared during World War II, Indonesian National Revolution and in the early years of the Sukarno era. On 1 July 1947, the government of Republic of Indonesia tried to revive tourism sector in Indonesia by establishing HONET (Hotel National & Tourism) led by R. Tjitpo Ruslan. This new national tourism authority took over many of the colonial heritage hotels in Java and renamed them all "Hotel Merdeka". After Dutch–Indonesian Round Table Conference in 1949, this tourism authority changed its name to NV HORNET. In 1952 the President formed the Inter-Departement 4 on Tourism Affairs which is responsible for reestablishing Indonesia as the world's tourism destination.

National pride and identity in the late 1950s and early 1960s was incorporated into the monumentalism of Sukarno in Jakarta  and this included the development of grand multi-storied international standard hotels and beach resorts, such as Hotel Indonesia in Jakarta (est. 1962), Ambarrukmo Hotel in Yogyakarta (est. 1965), Samudra Beach Hotel in Pelabuhan Ratu beach West Java (est. 1966), and Inna Grand Bali Beach Hotel in Bali (est. 1966). The political and economic instability of the mid-1960s saw tourism decline radically again. Bali, and in particular the small village of Kuta, was, however, in the 1960s, an important stopover on the overland hippy trail between Australia and Europe, and a "secret" untouched surf spot.

To stimulate tourism sector, Indonesia becomes a member of PATA in the early 1960s and appointed as the host of PATA annual conference in 1963 and 1974 in Jakarta, and 2003 in Bali. To host the 1974 PATA conference, the Hotel Borobudur was built and named as the official hotel of this event. At that time, it was the largest and the most luxurious hotel in Jakarta. Indonesia is also the host of PATA Travel Mart in 1985 and 1989 in Bali, and 2016 in Jakarta.

In the early-to-mid-1970s, high standard hotels and tourist facilities began to appear in Jakarta and Bali. After the completion of Borobudur restoration project in 1982, Yogyakarta become a popular tourist destination in Indonesia after Bali, mostly attracted to this 8th-century Buddhist monument, surrounding ancient Javanese temples and Yogyakarta Sultanate palace. From this period to the end of the Suharto era, governmental policies of the tourism industry included an array of regulations and developments to encourage increasing numbers of international tourists to both visit Indonesia and stay longer.

Statistics

Top 20 International Visitors in Indonesia

Tourist arrivals in Indonesia by nationality (2014–2023) 
Source: Statistics Indonesia

The ten most popular tourist destinations in Indonesia recorded by Central Statistics Agency (BPS) are Bali, West Java, Central Java, East Java, Jakarta, North Sumatra, Lampung, South Sulawesi, South Sumatra, Banten, and West Sumatra (which would make it 11 provinces today due to Banten previously having been a part of West Java).

As with most countries, domestic tourists are by far the largest market segment. The biggest movement of domestic tourists is during the annual Eid al-Fitr, locally known as lebaran. During this period, which is a two-week holiday after the month of fasting during Ramadan, many city-dwelling Muslim Indonesians visit relatives in their home towns. Intercity traffic is at its peak and often an additional surcharge is applied during this time.

Over the five years up to 2006, attention has been focused on generating more domestic tourism. Competition amongst budget airlines has increased the number of domestic air travellers throughout the country. Recently, the Ministry of Labour legislated to create long weekends by combining public holidays that fall close to weekends, except in the case of important religious holidays. During these long weekends, most hotels in popular destinations are fully booked.

With an average visit duration of 9–12 days, Indonesia gains  billion of foreign exchange income annually. This makes tourism Indonesia's third most important non-oil–gas source of foreign revenue, after timber and textile products.

After toppled Japan two years ago, China as the world's biggest tourism spenders now toppled Australia to become number three with 30.42 per cent increase year-on-year (y-o-y), while foreign tourists growth by 10.6 per cent y-o-y set to more than 2.9 million. The top countries of origin Q1 2014 data comes from the Asia-Pacific region, with Singapore (15.7 per cent), Malaysia (14.0), China (11.0), Australia, and Japan among the top countries of origin. The United Kingdom, France, and Germany are the largest sources of European visitors. Although Dutch visitors are at least in part keen to explore the historical relationships, many European visitors are seeking the tropical weather at the beaches in Bali.

Around 59% of all visitors are travelling to Indonesia for holiday purposes, while 38% for business.

In 2012, according to the World Travel & Tourism Council, travel and tourism made a total contribution of 8.9% of GDP and supported 8% of total employment in Indonesia.

Nature tourism 

Indonesia has a well-preserved, natural ecosystem with rainforests that stretch over about 57% of Indonesia's land, approximately 2% of which are mangrove systems. One reason why the natural ecosystem in Indonesia is still well-preserved is because only 6,000 islands out of 17,000 are permanently inhabited. Forests on Sumatra and Java are examples of popular tourist destinations. However, most of the well-preserved beaches are those in more isolated and less developed areas, such as Karimunjawa, the Togian Islands, and the Banda Islands.

Dive sites 

With more than 17,508 islands, Indonesia presents ample diving opportunities. With 20% of the world's coral reefs, over 3,000 different species of fish and 600 coral species, deep water trenches, volcanic sea mounts, World War II wrecks, and an endless variety of macro life, scuba diving in Indonesia is both excellent and inexpensive. Bunaken National Marine Park, at the northern tip of Sulawesi, claims to have seven times more genera of coral than Hawaii, and has more than 70% of all the known fish species of the Indo-Western Pacific. According to Conservation International, marine surveys suggest that the marine life diversity in the Raja Ampat area is the highest recorded on Earth. Moreover, there are over 3,500 species living in Indonesian waters, including sharks, dolphins, manta rays, turtles, morays, cuttlefish, octopus and scorpionfish, compared to 1,500 on the Great Barrier Reef and 600 in the Red Sea. Other popular dive sites on Bali are at Candidasa and Menjangan. Across the Badung Strait from Bali, there are several popular dive sites on Nusa Lembongan and Nusa Penida. Lombok's three Gilis (Gili Air, Gili Meno and Gili Trawangan) are popular as is Bangka. Saronde Island is a very popular spot also in Gorontalo Sulawesi. Some of the most famous diving sites in Indonesia are also the most difficult to reach, with places like Biak off the coast of Papua and the Alor Archipelago among the popular, more remote, destinations for divers.

Surf breaks 

Surfing is also a popular water activity in Indonesia and the sites are recognised as world-class. The well-known locations are mostly located on the southern, Indian Ocean side of Indonesia, the largest breaks being on the southern Java. However, the north coast does not receive the same surf from the Java Sea. Surf breaks can be found all the way along Sumatra, down to Nusa Tenggara, including Aceh, Bali, Banten, Java, Lombok, the Mentawai Islands, and Sumbawa. Although Indonesia has many world-class surfing spots, the majority of surfers come from abroad, especially Australia and the United States. However, enthusiasm for local surfing began in Bali and West Java's Pelabuhan Ratu and Pangandaran beach, with most surfers arriving from nearby cities of Jakarta and Bandung.

In 2018, World Surf League has had 8 surfing events in Indonesia.

On Bali, there are about 33 surf locations, from West Bali to East Bali including four on the offshore island of Nusa Lembongan. In Sumbawa, Hu'u and Lakey Beach in Cempi Bay are popular surfing spots among surfing enthusiasts. Sumatra is the second island, with the greatest number of surf spots, with 18 altogether. High season for surfing is around May to September with the trade winds blowing from east to south-east. From October to April, winds tend to come from the west to north-west, so the east coast breaks get the offshore winds.

Two well-known surf breaks in Indonesia are the G-Land in the Bay of Grajagan, East Java, and Lagundri Bay at the southern end of Nias island. G-Land was first identified in 1972 when a surfer saw the break from the window of a plane. Since 6 to 8-foot (Hawaiian scale) waves were discovered by surfers at Lagundri Bay in 1975, the island has become famous for surfing worldwide.

National parks 

Bogor Botanical Gardens established in 1817, and Cibodas Botanical Gardens established in 1862, are two among the oldest botanical gardens in Asia. With rich collections of tropical plants, these gardens are the centre of botanical research as well as tourism attraction since the colonial era.

There are 50 national parks in Indonesia, of which six are World Heritage listed. The largest national parks in Sumatra are the  Gunung Leuser National Park, the  Kerinci Seblat National Park and the  Bukit Barisan Selatan National Park, all three recognised as Tropical Rainforest Heritage of Sumatra on the UNESCO World Heritage list. Other national parks on the list are Lorentz National Park in Papua, Komodo National Park in the Lesser Sunda Islands, and Ujung Kulon National Park in the west of Java.

To be noticed, different national parks offer different biodiversity, as the natural habitat in Indonesia is divided into two areas by the Wallace line. The Wallacea biogeographical distinction means the western part of Indonesia (Sumatra, Java, Kalimantan) have the same flora and fauna characteristics as the Asian continent, whilst the remaining eastern part of Indonesia has similarity with the Australian continent.

Many native species such as Sumatran elephants, Sumatran tigers, Sumatran rhinoceros, Javan rhinoceros and orangutans are listed as endangered or critically endangered, and the remaining populations are found in national parks and other conservation areas. Sumatran orangutan can be visited in the Bukit Lawang conservation area, while the Bornean orangutan can be visited in Tanjung Puting national park, Central Kalimantan. The world's largest flower, rafflesia arnoldi, and the tallest flower, titan arum, can be found in Sumatra.

The east side of the Wallacea line offers the most remarkable, rarest, and exotic animals on earth. Birds-of-paradise, locally known as cendrawasih, are plumed birds that can be found among other fauna in Papua New Guinea. The largest bird in Papua is the flightless cassowary. One species of lizard, the Komodo dragon can easily be found on Komodo, located in the Nusa Tenggara lesser islands region. Besides Komodo island, this endangered species can also be found on the islands of Rinca, Padar and Flores.

Volcanoes 

Hiking and camping in the mountains are popular adventure activities. Some mountains contain ridge rivers, offering rafting activity. Though volcanic mountains can be dangerous, they have become major tourist destinations. Several tourists have died on the slopes of Mount Rinjani, Indonesia's second-highest volcano and a popular destination for climbers visiting Lombok in eastern Indonesia. Gede Pangrango volcano in West Java is also a popular hiking destination, especially among domestic hikers.

In Sumbawa, Mount Tambora with its historical massive volcanic eruption back in 1815 that produced massive caldera also had gained attention among hikers. In the neighbouring island of Flores, the three-coloured volcanic crater-lake of Kelimutu is also hailed as one of Indonesia's natural wonder and had attracted visitors worldwide. Puncak Jaya in the Lorentz National Park, the highest mountain in Indonesia and one of the few mountains with ice caps at the (tropical) equator offers the opportunity of rock climbing. In Sumatra, there are the remains of a supervolcano eruption that have created the landscape of Lake Toba close to Medan in North Sumatra.

Cultural tourism 

Indonesia consists of over 1,300 ethnic groups, spread over a 1.8 million km2 area of 6,000 inhabited islands. This creates a cultural diversity, further compounded by Hindu, Buddhist, Islamic and European colonialist influences. In Bali, where most of Indonesian Hindus live, cultural and religious festivals with Balinese dance-drama performances in Balinese temples are major attractions to foreign tourists.

Despite foreign influences, a diverse array of indigenous traditional cultures is still evident in Indonesia. The indigenous ethnic group of Toraja in South Sulawesi, still has a strong tradition that descends from animistic beliefs even though most Toraja are Christian now. One of the most famous Toraja tradition is their funeral rites, Rambu Solo. The Minangkabau ethnic group retain a unique matrilineal culture, despite being devoted Muslims. Other indigenous ethnic groups include the Asmat and Dani in Papua, the Dayak in Kalimantan and the Mentawai in Sumatra, where traditional rituals are still observed.

Cultural tourism also plays a significant part in Yogyakarta, a special province in Indonesia known as the centre of classical Javanese fine art and culture. The rise and fall of Buddhist, Hindu, and Islamic kingdoms in Central Java has transformed Yogyakarta into a melting pot of Indonesian culture. Classical Javanese dances are performed in royal courts of Yogyakarta and Surakarta, as well as Javanese Ramayana Ballet performed in Prambanan open-air theatre.

Most major Indonesian cities have their state-owned museums, although most are in modest display. The most complete and comprehensive museum that displaying Indonesian culture and history spanned from prehistoric to colonial era is National Museum of Indonesia located in Jakarta.

For Indonesian and foreign visitors unable to visit all Indonesian provinces, Taman Mini Indonesia Indah in East Jakarta provides a comprehensive microcosm of Indonesian culture. Established in 1975 by Tien Suharto, this park displaying museums, separate pavilions with the collections of Indonesian architecture, clothing, dances and traditions all depicted impeccably.

Ancient Hindu and Buddhist temples 

From the 4th century until the 15th century, Hinduism and Buddhism shaped the culture of Indonesia. Kingdoms rise and fall, such as Mataram Kingdom, Srivijaya, Kediri, Singhasari and Majapahit. Along with the Indonesian classical history of Hindu-Buddhist era, they produced some temples and monuments called candi. The best-preserved Buddhist shrine, which was built during the Sailendra dynasty in the 8th century, is Borobudur temple in Central Java. A giant stone mandala stepped pyramid adorned with bell-shaped stupas, richly adorned with bas-reliefs telling the stories and teachings of Buddha.

A few kilometres to the southeast is the Prambanan complex, the largest Hindu temple in Indonesia built during the second Mataram dynasty. The Prambanan temple is dedicated to Trimurti; Shiva, Vishnu and Brahma, three highest gods in Hinduism. Both the Borobudur and the Prambanan temple compounds have been listed in the UNESCO World Heritage list since 1991. Both temple are the largest and the most popular, conveniently accessible from Yogyakarta, the heartland of Javanese culture. The Ramayana Javanese dance is performed routinely on the stage near Prambanan temple, provides the visitors with the glimpse of Javanese classical culture.

In and around Jogjakarta, the ancient Javanese archaeology and temple enthusiast may still discover numerous ancient temples, accessible by car or motorcycle. Although not as grand and popular as Borobudur and Prambanan, these smaller temples provide a glimpse of ancient culture and the intricate details of ancient Java temple architecture. Mendut and Pawon temples are located in Kedu Plain near Borobudur, while Ratu Boko, Sewu, Lumbung, Plaosan, Kalasan, and Sari are located in Prambanan Plain near Prambanan temple.

The temples of East Java dated from the era of Singhasari and Majapahit; mostly located in Trowulan archaeological site, and also scattered around Blitar and Malang. Although not as grand and popular as the temples of Central Java, the East Javanese temples are also an interesting destination for candi and Indonesian ancient history enthusiast. East Javanese temples such as Wringin Lawang, Brahu, Bajang Ratu, and Candi Tikus in Trowulan archaeological site. Jawi temple near Pandaan, south of Surabaya, Penataran temple in Blitar, Kidal temple and Singhasari temple near Malang.

Most major Indonesian archaeological sites are equipped with museums; such as Samudra Raksa Museum and Karmawibhangga Museum in Borobudur, Prambanan museum in Prambanan temple compounds, and Trowulan Museum located in former Majapahit capital of Trowulan archaeological site. Some of the archaeological discoveries are also displayed in municipal museums, such as Sonobudoyo Museum in Yogyakarta and Radyapustaka Museum in Surakarta, and of course the Indonesian National Museum in Jakarta.

Sumatra also home of several ancient Buddhist temples mostly linked to Srivijaya kingdom, such as Muaro Jambi in Jambi province, Muara Takus in Riau and Biaro Bahal in North Sumatra. Sumatran temples, however, are not as elaborated and as spectacular as its Javanese counterpart, and subsequently less popular. The location is rural, quite far from large cities, so renting a car to visit these sites is advisable since public transportation to the location is scarce.

Islamic heritage 

Islam has also contributed greatly to the cultural society in Indonesia. As of 2006, 88% of Indonesia's recorded population were Muslim. Islamic culture is prominent in Sumatra, and a few of the remaining sultanate palaces can be seen in Medan and Tanjung Pinang.

The Islamic heritage tourism is also popular, especially among Indonesian Muslims and Muslims from neighbouring countries such as Malaysia, Singapore and Brunei that shared common Southeast Asian Islamic heritage. The activity usually linked with Islamic ziyarat pilgrimage to historical Islamic sites, such as historical mosques and tombs of venerated Islamic figures. However, for visitors in Islamic sites, either local or foreign, Muslim or non-Muslim, the rules of conduct and dress modesty is applied, such as removing the footwear while entering mosques or makam (tombs), a visitor should not enter the site wearing shorts (sarong usually lent near the entrance to cover the lower torso of the visitors).

In Aceh the Baiturrahman Grand Mosque and tombs of Aceh Sultanate kings is a popular destination, while in Medan the Medan Great Mosque and Maimun Palace is also major Islamic heritage destination. Most of the Indonesian major cities have their own historical or monumental Masjid Agung (Grand Mosque) that become city's landmark as well as a tourism attraction. Istiqlal Mosque, Jakarta, the Indonesian national mosque and the largest in Southeast Asia is Jakarta's major landmark as well as a tourist attraction.

In Java the ziyarat pilgrimage is usually linked to historically important Islamic figures of Wali Sanga (Nine Saints), they are important because of their historic role in the Spread of Islam in Indonesia. Their tombs and mosques scattered along with Java's north coast towns, such as Demak, Kudus, Cirebon, Gresik, to Ampel in Surabaya. The 15th-century Agung Demak Mosque hailed as the first mosque established in Java. Menara Kudus Mosque is notable for incorporating Majapahit Hindu-Javanese architecture. The tomb of Sunan Gunungjati near Cirebon, is also the important ziyarat site in West Java.

The heritage tourism might also be focused on the era of 17th- to 19th-century royal Javanese courts of Yogyakarta Sultanate, Surakarta Sunanate and Mangkunegaran.

Colonial heritage 

The heritage tourism is focused on specific interest on Indonesian history, such as colonial architectural heritage of Dutch East Indies era in Indonesia. The colonial heritage tourism mostly attracted visitors from the Netherlands that share historical ties with Indonesia, as well as Indonesian or foreign colonial history enthusiast.

The activities among others are visiting museums, churches, forts and historical colonial buildings, as well as spend some nights in colonial heritage hotels. The popular heritage tourism attractions are Kota – the centre of old Jakarta, with its Maritime Museum, Kota Intan drawbridge, Gereja Sion, Wayang Museum, Stadhuis Batavia, Fine Art and Ceramic Museum, Toko Merah, Bank Indonesia Museum, Bank Mandiri Museum, Jakarta Kota railway station, and Glodok (Jakarta Chinatown). In the old ports of Sunda Kelapa, in Jakarta and Paotere in Makassar the tall-masted pinisi ship still sailed. The Jakarta Cathedral with neo-gothic architecture in Central Jakarta also attracted architecture enthusiast.

Bandung historical avenue around Asia Afrika and Braga Street displays rich collections of Indies and Art deco architecture from early 20th century. Several hotels such as Savoy Homann in Bandung and Hotel Majapahit in Surabaya are colonial heritage hotels suitable for those whom interested in Dutch East Indies colonial history. The VOC forts can be found in Yogyakarta, Makassar, Bengkulu and Ambon. The colonial buildings might also be found in old town parts of Indonesian cities, such as Semarang, Surabaya, Malang, Medan, and Sawahlunto.

Village tourism 

Village tourism (Indonesian: desa wisata) is a tourism concept in Indonesia to integrate attraction, activity, accommodation, and supporting facility within a specific area, called desa or village, to maximize tourism potential of that specific area. Unlike popular resorts area that mostly owned by global hotel chains, village tourism is usually modest small scale family or community-owned accommodations; i.e. boarding house, guest house, bed and breakfast, lodge, tavern, restaurant or warung shop. This community-based tourism model is intended to generate the local economy, create jobs, as well as empowering the local community.

Tourism potential may include natural points of interest, specific food, local activity, festivals, crafts, arts and cultural events that are unique to that area. Indonesia have 1,734 tourism village, most of it located at Java and Bali.

Leisure and urban tourism 
Leisure and urban tourism activities include shopping, sightseeing in big cities, or enjoying modern amusement parks, nightlife and entertainment. To some extent, urban tourism might also involve municipal culture and heritage tourism, such as visits to city museums or parts of the colonial old town.

Shopping 

The nation's capital, Jakarta, offers many places for shopping. Next to high-end shopping centres with branded products, Indonesia is also a popular destination for handicraft shopping in the region. Certain Indonesian traditional crafts such as batik, songket, ikat weaving, embroidery, wooden statue and fashion products are popular souvenirs for visitors.

Indonesian textile and fashion products are known for their good value; good quality with relatively cheap and reasonable price. Bandung is a popular shopping destination for fashion products among Malaysians and Singaporeans. Bali has many shopping centres, for instance, the Kuta shopping centre and the Galeria Nusa Dua.

Amusement and theme parks 

Amusement parks with its rides are popular destination for Indonesian families and teenager alike. Ancol Dreamland with Dunia Fantasi theme park and Atlantis Water Adventure is Jakarta's answer to Disneyland-style amusement park and water park. Several similar theme parks also developed in other cities, such as Trans Studio Makassar and Trans Studio Bandung.

Gastronomy tourism 

Indonesia has rich and diverse culinary traditions, and might be considered as one of the richest and the best in the world; such as rendang that recently voted as the number one dish of CNN International 'World's 50 Most Delicious Foods' list. Many regional cuisines exist, often based upon indigenous culture and foreign influences. Indonesian cuisine varies greatly by region and has many different influences. From succulent coconut-milk and curry rich Minangkabau cuisine to Oceanian seafood meal of Papuan and Ambonese cuisine. Embarked on a journey through Indonesian cuisine is as exciting as enjoying the diversity of Indonesian culture, as some kind of dishes might have myriad variations of different recipes across archipelago.
Some popular Indonesian dishes such as nasi goreng,  sate, and soto are ubiquitous in the country and have numerous regional variations. These dishes are considered as Indonesian national dishes.

Eating establishments in Indonesia are available from the modest street-side cart vendors, to the luxury fine-dining restaurants. Most of malls and shopping centres in Indonesian major cities usually have an entire floor dedicated as a food courts, where one could samples rich variety of Indonesian cuisine, and some Indonesian cities have their own signature dishes. Such as Mie Aceh, Padang's rendang, Palembang's pempek, Jakarta's soto betawi and gado-gado, Bandung's siomay and batagor, Yogyakarta's gudeg, Solo's tongseng, Semarang's lumpia, Surabaya's rawon, Madura's satay, Balinese nasi campur and babi guling, Makassar's konro, Manado's tinutuan, to Chinese Indonesian mie goreng. Some exhibitions, fairs and events often also incorporated eating experiences. Such as Jakarta Fair that offer local delicacies as well as food products from various corners of Indonesia, or Jakarta Fashion & Food Festival (JFFF) that feature food and fashion.

Wellness and Spas 

Indonesia has local tradition of health and beauty treatments. However, it was not until 2000s that wellness tourism business has become particularly popular in Java and Bali. In 2009 and 2012, Indonesia won international wellness awards as the world's best spa destination.

Traditionally Indonesians—especially in Java and Bali—has developed their own traditional wellness treatment for health, beauty and wellbeing purposes. Traditional treatments includes Javanese jamu herbal medicine, also Javanese and Balinese massage. Spas, fitness centres, and yoga classes are offered to tourists in major Indonesian cities, especially in Bali, Yogyakarta, Jakarta and Bandung. Tourism Ministry of Indonesia has promoted Indonesia as a spa and wellness destination through various exhibitions.

Historically, the Taman Sari of Yogyakarta is a water castle built-in 1758 functioned as a pleasure garden for Sultan Hamengkubuwono I, his concubines and the royal family. This palace equipped with rooms and bathing pools served as a place to cleanse, purify and energize body and soul, restricted only for the king and royals, it was pretty much an 18th-century royal spa. Javanese royal treatments including jamu herbal medicine, traditional massage, luluran (herbal body scrub), bathing and aromatheraphy.

In 2019 Indonesian Tourism Ministry is also partnering with Indonesian Health Ministry to provide health tourism, in four sectors: medical tourism, wellness tourism and Jamu, sports tourism, and health academic tourism.

Golfing 

Another popular tourist activity is golfing, a favourite sport among the upper class Indonesians and foreigners. Indonesia has around 150 golf courses. Golf courses concentrated mostly in Greater Jakarta, West Java, East Java, Bali, Bintan and Batam. Bali, West Java and Yogyakarta have well-designed golf courses, either by the sea or on highland overlooking volcanoes. Some notable golf courses include Taman Dayu in Pasuruan East Java, Ria Bintan, Damai Indah Golf Bumi Serpong Damai Tangerang, Rancamaya near Bogor, New Kuta Golf in Bali, and Merapi Golf near Yogyakarta.

Nightlife 

Nightlife of Indonesia is also popular among foreigners, especially in the big cities like Jakarta, Bandung, Surabaya, Manado, Denpasar and Medan. Jakarta and Bali for example, are quite popular for its vibrant nightlife and festivals as the city boast its large numbers of discotheque and clubs. The annual Djakarta Warehouse Project dance music festival is a major Electronic Dance Music event in Asia.

Sex tourism 

International sex tourism and child sex tourism remains an issue, especially on the islands of Batam and Karimun and in major urban centres and tourist destinations across the country, including Bali and Riau Islands. In Indonesia, prostitution is illegal and interpreted as a "crime against decency and morality". In practice, however, prostitution is quite widespread, tolerated, and somewhat regulated, mostly illegally or underground in discotheques, massage parlours, and karaoke rooms, and also visible on certain streets. It is estimated that 40,000 to 70,000 Indonesian children are being exploited in prostitution within the country. Prostitution is conducted by both genders, with Bali being notorious for its 'Kuta Cowboys', local gigolos targeting foreign female tourists.

Visa regulations

Visa free 
Following the COVID-19 pandemic in Indonesia, the Directorate General of Immigration published a new list of countries whose nationals are visa-exempt.

Nationals of the 10 visa-exempt countries may enter Indonesia through any of the designated border crossings, comprising 15 airports, 91 seaports and 12 cross-border land posts.

e-VOA / Visa on arrival 
Following the COVID-19 pandemic in Indonesia, the Directorate General of Immigration also published a new list of countries whose nationals are eligible to obtain a visa on arrival to Indonesia.

Nationals of the following 89 countries may apply for a e-VOA / Visa on arrival to Indonesia. A visa obtained on arrival costs Rp500,000, and is valid for a maximum stay of 30 days, though the visa can be extended once inside Indonesia for another 30 days at designated entry points by paying another Rp500,000.

Nationals of a country eligible for a visa on arrival may obtain a visa at any of the designated border crossings, comprising 16 airports, 91 seaports and 6 cross-border posts.

Transit without a visa 
Passengers transiting through Soekarno-Hatta International Airport for less than 24 hours, or other airports for less than 8 hours, do not require a visa. However, those who are switching terminals in Soekarno-Hatta, or those transiting through Ngurah Rai International Airport require a visa unless they are from a visa-exempt jurisdiction.

Approval required

Nationals who wish to obtain a multiple-entry visa, extend their visa (up to a maximum of five extensions) or who are not eligible for either visa-free entry or visa on arrival must apply for a visa in advance at an Indonesian embassy or consulate.

Nationals of the following 8 countries require prior approval from the Directorate General of Immigration in Jakarta. Besides a visa, they must hold a reference letter issued by the Directorate General of Immigration, as well as the invitation letter used to apply for their Indonesian visa before travelling to Indonesia. This policy is called the Indonesian Calling Visa.

Entry points 

List of entry points with Visa on Arrival facility.

Airport
 Sumatra
 Banda Aceh, Aceh – Sultan Iskandar Muda Airport (BTJ)
 Medan, North Sumatra – Kuala Namu Airport (KNO)
 Pekanbaru, Riau – Sultan Syarif Kasim II Airport (PKU)
 Padang, West Sumatra – Minangkabau International Airport (PDG)
 Batam, Riau Islands – Hang Nadim International Airport (BTH)
 Palembang, South Sumatra – Sultan Mahmud Badaruddin II Airport (PLM)
 Java
 Jakarta – Soekarno–Hatta International Airport (CGK)
 Jakarta – Halim Perdanakusuma Airport (HLP)
 Surabaya, East Java – Juanda International Airport (SUB)
 Yogyakarta, Yogyakarta – Yogyakarta International Airport (YIA)
 Surakarta/Solo, Central Java – Adisumarmo International Airport (SOC)
 Bandung, West Java – Husein Sastranegara International Airport (BDO)
 Semarang, Central Java – Achmad Yani International Airport (SRG)
 Lesser Sunda Islands
 Denpasar, Bali – Ngurah Rai International Airport (DPS)
 Mataram, West Nusa Tenggara – Lombok International Airport (LOP)
 Kupang, East Nusa Tenggara – El Tari Airport (KOE)
 Sulawesi
 Makassar, South Sulawesi – Hasanuddin International Airport (UPG)
 Manado, North Sulawesi – Sam Ratulangi International Airport (MDC)
 Kalimantan
 Balikpapan, East Kalimantan – Sultan Aji Muhammad Sulaiman Airport (BPN)
 Pontianak, West Kalimantan – Supadio Airport (PNK)

Seaport

 Riau Islands
 Batam – Sekupang, Citra Tri Tunas, Nongsa Terminal Bahari, Marina Teluk Senimba, Batam Center
 Tanjung Uban – Bandar Bentan Telani Lagoi, Bandar Seri Udana Lobam
 Tanjung Pinang – Sri Bintan Pura
 Tanjung Balai Karimun – Tanjung Balai Karimun
 North Sumatra
 Medan – Belawan
 Sibolga – Sibolga
 Riau
 Dumai – Yos Sudarso
 West Sumatra
 Padang – Teluk Bayur
 Jakarta
 Jakarta – Tanjung Priok
 Central Java
 Semarang – Tanjung Mas
 Bali
 Badung – Benoa
 Karangasem – Padang Bai
 North Sulawesi
 Bitung – Bitung
 South Sulawesi
 Makassar – Soekarno-Hatta
 Pare-Pare – Pare-Pare
 East Nusa Tenggara
 Maumere – Maumere
 Kupang – Tenau
 Papua
 Jayapura – Jayapura

Border crossing
 Entikong, West Kalimantan – Entikong Border Crossing
 Aruk, Sambas Regency, West Kalimantan – Aruk Border Crossing
 Mota'ain, East Nusa Tenggara – Mota'ain Border Crossing
 Tunon Taka, Nunukan, North Kalimantan

Visa before arrival 

Nationals who are not eligible for visa-free or VOA need to apply for the visa at an Indonesian embassy or consulate.

Nationals from 8 following countries require an approval from Immigration Office in Indonesia before travelling for business, tourist and social visit purposes (this policy is called Indonesian Calling Visa):

Transportation 

International airports

Each of the larger Indonesian islands have at least one international airport. The biggest and the busiest airport in Indonesia, Soekarno-Hatta International Airport (IATA: CGK), located in Tangerang, is serving the national capital Greater Jakarta area. Followed by Juanda International Airport (IATA: SUB) in Surabaya, East Java as the second busiest airport in the country. There are five more international airports on Java, Yogyakarta International Airport (IATA: YIA) in Yogyakarta, Adisumarmo International Airport (IATA: SOC) in Solo, Central Java, Ahmad Yani International Airport (IATA: SRG) in Semarang, Central Java, and Husein Sastranegara International Airport (IATA: BDO) in Bandung, West Java. Kertajati International Airport was inaugurated in 2017 airport as gateway for West Java as well as for Central Java in Majalengka.

Bali, the tourism hotspot which is part of the Nusa Tenggara Islands, has the Ngurah Rai International Airport (IATA: DPS), which is the third busiest in Indonesia and one of the main entry points for foreign visitors. Lombok International Airport in the island of Lombok opened on 1 October 2011.

There are nine international airport in Sumatra; Kualanamu International Airport in Medan, Sisingamangaraja XII International Airport in Siborong-Borong, North Sumatra, Sultan Mahmud Badaruddin II International Airport in Palembang, South Sumatra, Sultan Iskandar Muda International Airport in Banda Aceh, Aceh, Sultan Syarif Kasim II International Airport in Pekanbaru, Riau, Minangkabau International Airport in Padang, West Sumatra, H.A.S. Hanandjoeddin International Airport in Tanjung Pandan, Bangka Belitung, and Hang Nadim International Airport in Batam, Raja Haji Fisabilillah International Airport in Bintan, Riau Islands.

In Kalimantan, there are five international airport at Balikpapan, Banjarmasin, Pontianak, Samarinda, and Juwata International Airport, Tarakan. In Sulawesi, there are two international airports, located in Makassar and Manado. The Sultan Hasanuddin International Airport in Makassar, South Sulawesi, is a major hub serving central and eastern Indonesia is also the 4th busiest. Sam Ratulangi International Airport, also known as Manado International Airport, is located in North Sulawesi, 13 kilometres northeast of Manado. The airport is named after the Minahasan educator and independence hero Sam Ratulangi.

Other international airports in Indonesia include Domine Eduard Osok Airport in Sorong, West Papua, Sentani International Airport in Jayapura, Mopah International Airport in Merauke, Papua, El Tari International Airport in Kupang, East Nusa Tenggara.

Tourism marketing 

Destination Management Organization

One program of Central Government is Destination Management Organization (DMO), an integrated promotion and management program which involving all stake holders in tourism industry, including the local authority, business owners and local people. The DMO targets for 2010–2014 were 15 areas: Sabang, Toba, Jakarta Old City Area, Pangandaran, Borobudur, Tanjung Puting, Bromo-Tengger-Semeru, Batur Bali Area, Rinjani, Derawan Islands, Toraja, Bunaken, Wakatobi, Raja Ampat, Komodo-Kelimutu-Flores.

Indonesian tourism campaigns 

The official Indonesian government authority that is responsible for the tourism sector in Indonesia is the Ministry of Culture and Tourism of Indonesia. Several campaigns to promote Indonesian tourism have been launched, either by government or private sectors through various media such as print, television, and online.

Visit Indonesia Year 1991
Learning from neighbouring countries' success, such as Thailand, Singapore and Malaysia, which successfully gained benefits and exploited their tourism sectors through intensive promotions, in the early 1990s the Indonesian government launched integrated efforts to promote Indonesian tourism worldwide. The first integrated campaign was coined as Visit Indonesia Year, and the first year was the Visit Indonesia Year 1991.

Visit Indonesia Year 2008
The Indonesian Ministry of Culture and Tourism declared 2008 as a Visit Indonesia Year. Visit Indonesia Year 2008 was officially launched on 26 December 2007. The figure of Visit Indonesia Year 2008 branding took the concept of Garuda Pancasila as the Indonesian way of life. The five components of Pancasila were represented by five different coloured lines and symbolised the Indonesian Unity in Diversity. The targeted number was 7 million. Visit Indonesia Year 2008 also commemorated 100 years of Indonesia's national awakening in 1908.

Visit Indonesia Year 2009

Tourism Indonesia Mart & Expo (TIME) 2009 was held at Santosa Villas & Resort in Senggigi on the west coast of Lombok NTB. Entering its 16th year of conduct, TIME 2009 was organised by the Indonesian Tourism Promotion Board (ITPB) and received the support of a wide number of tour participants in Indonesia.

TIME 2009 attracted 127 buyers from 25 countries. The top five buyers were from Korea, India, Malaysia, Indonesia, the United States, and the Netherlands. TIME 2009 also attracted a total of 250 delegates of Sellers from 97 companies of Indonesia occupying 84 booths at the exhibition. Sellers came from 15 provinces dominated by West Nusa Tenggara, Jakarta, Bali, Central Java, and East Kalimantan as top five Sellers. The percentage of sellers based on the industry was hotel, resort & spa (75%), NTO (10%), tour operator/travel agent (7%), adventure/activity holiday (3%), airline (1.5%), and others (hotel management, tourism board, tourism organization & travel portal 8.5%). Amidst current global financial crisis, TIME 2009 booked an estimated of the transaction of  million, or increasing 15% from the previous TIME held in Makassar, South Sulawesi in 2008.

Visit Indonesia Year 2010

Following the hosting on the island of Lombok in 2009, the event was again hosted in Lombok-Sumbawa on 12–15 October 2010 at Santosa Villas & Resort in Senggigi on the west coast of Lombok. Entering its 16th year, TIME was organised by the Indonesian Tourism Promotion Board (ITPB) and supported by a wide number of tour participants in Indonesia. TIME 2010 was supported by the travel and tourism industry in Indonesia, including the Ministry of Culture & Tourism, the Provincial Government of West Nusa Tenggara, West Nusa Tenggara Culture & Tourism Office, Lombok Sumbawa Promo, Garuda Indonesia as official airline, other supporting airlines, Indonesia National Air Carriers Association (INACA), Board of Airline Representatives Indonesia (BARINDO), Association of Indonesian Tours & Travel Agencies (ASITA), Indonesia Hotels and Restaurant Association (PHRI), Indonesian Conference and Convention Association (INCCA), Pacto Convex as the event organiser, supported by national and international media. Lombok and Sumbawa in West Nusa Tenggara set a target of wooing one million tourists to visit the islands by 2012.

Wonderful Indonesia (since 2011)

Wonderful Indonesia has been the slogan since January 2011 of an international marketing campaign directed by the Indonesian Ministry of Culture and Tourism to promote tourism. The campaign replaced the previous "Visit Indonesia Year" campaign which had been used since 1991. The "Wonderful Indonesia" concept highlights Indonesia's "wonderful" nature, cultures, people, food, and value for the money. After the campaign was launched, Indonesia reported an increase of foreign visitors; from 7,002,944 in 2010, to 7,649,731 in 2011; and 8,044,462 in 2012.

In late January 2011, Culture and Tourism Minister Jero Wacik announced that "Wonderful Indonesia" would replace the previous "Visit Indonesia Year" branding used by the nation's official tourism promotional campaigns, although the logo of stylised curves Garuda remain. The minister announced that in 2010, foreign tourists visiting Indonesia touched 7 million and made predictions of 7.7 million in 2011. He was reported as describing the new branding as reflecting "the country's beautiful nature, unique culture, varied food, hospitable people and price competitiveness. "We expect each tourist will spend around US$1,100 and with an optimistic target of 7.7 million arrivals, we will get $8.3 billion," from this. The Culture and Tourism Minister added that 50 per cent of the revenue would be generated from about 600 meetings, conventions and exhibitions that were expected to take place in various places throughout the country 2011. He further added in the announcements of January 2011 that his ministry would be promoting the country's attractions under the eco-cultural banner.

Pesona Indonesia (since 2014)
In December 2014, the new Minister of Tourism, Arief Yahya launched the new brand Pesona Indonesia to target the domestic tourism market. Both Wonderful Indonesia and Pesona Indonesia have the same Garuda logo. The minister hopes that both brands will be a single tourism identity for Indonesia.

2016

For most of the time, Indonesian tourism relies heavily on the charm of Bali as a drawing force to attract tourists. As a result, most foreign visitors are drawn and concentrated only in Bali, which already has quite well-developed tourism culture and infrastructure. To distribute the wealth of tourism and generate tourism-related economic opportunities among Indonesian provinces, the tourism authority launched a program to create and add new centres of attraction as an alternative for Bali.

In mid-2016, the Indonesian Ministry of Tourism launched a new program named "10 Priority Tourism Destinations (Indonesian: 10 Destinasi Wisata Prioritas)" dubbed as "the new Bali". The ten destinations are Borobudur Temple, Lake Toba, Mount Bromo, Komodo National Park, Kepulauan Seribu, Mandalika, Wakatobi Islands, Tanjung Kelayang beach, Tanjung Lesung beach, and Morotai island.

The efforts among others by creating and improving tourism infrastructure facilities including hotels, homestays, restaurants, handicraft and souvenir art markets, also improving interconnection into these regions by improving and constructing new airports. However, in practice by 2017 among these 10 priorities, only 4 of them that kick-off and received full government attention and supports; they are Lake Toba in North Sumatra, Borobudur in Central Java, Labuan Bajo as the gate into Komodo National park, and Mandalika in Lombok.

Challenges to the tourism industry

Terrorism 

Although Indonesia had suffered terrorist attacks back in the 1980s, it was not until 2000s that the attacks have become more disturbingly organized. The first major terrorist attack in Indonesia was 2002 Bali bombing. This was a major blow to Indonesia's tourism industry. A series of travel warnings were issued by several countries. After the attack, the rate of tourism in Bali decreased by 32%.

After this 2002 attack, the following three years also suffered three major terrorist bombings: the 2003 Marriott Hotel bombing, the 2004 Australian embassy bombing in Jakarta, and a second bombing in Bali. Fortunately in 2008, no major terrorist attack occurred since 2005, and the United States Government lifted its warning against travel to Indonesia. In 2006, 227,000 Australians visited Indonesia, and in 2007, this tourist rate continued to rise with a recorded 314,000 tourists entering Indonesia.

In 2008, the US government lifted their travel warning on Indonesia.

By 2016, the terrorist threat was renewed and reactivated by the outbreak of ISIS-affiliated sleeper cells in the region. In 2016, Jakarta suffered terrorist attack. And by 2018, numbers of terrorist attacks erupted in Surabaya and Pekanbaru.

Unconducive policies 

Most of the major tourist destinations in Indonesia, especially Bali, Yogyakarta, Batam, Bandung and Jakarta, have a rather relaxed modern cosmopolitan social outlook, which is quite conducive for the tourism industry. However, certain regional provinces might not have that kind of luxury and tend to be conservative. Next to national laws, certain Indonesian province have applied regional autonomous law, some of them based on Islamic sharia law, such as Aceh province. Extra caution must be demonstrated by visitors to Aceh since the province has rather strict Islamic-based law, enforced by Islamic religious police, called the Wilayatul Hisbah in Indonesia.

Thus, some certain normally private matters, such as beach clothing (esp, bikini), modesty issue, party and the consumption of alcohol, to a display of affections between a couple, are discouraged and frowned upon, and might led to a legal problem. Carefulness and discretion are required, especially for unmarried couple and LGBT travellers.

The legal restriction against alcohol, pushed forward by Islamist parties and organizations in the country, is also harming tourism and service sector. As a result, the alcohol tax in Indonesia is among the highest in the world, which caused an unusually high price for alcoholic beverages. This policy is quite harmful to bar, club and restaurant industry in Indonesia.

Another unconducive policy is a rather strict policy on nightlife; local authority sometimes launched a raid on clubs, karaoke and discothèque in a pretext to curb down drugs and substance abuse in these places, which might be inconvenient for visitors. It was reported in April 2017 that the Indonesian government authorities arrested 32 foreign nationals for failing to show proper ID during a raid on an entertainment hub in Batam on 23 April 2017. Yudi Kurnain, a Batam Legislative Council member had condemned the raid, saying that it might discourage tourism in the island. He was quoted as saying, "They should humanely conduct immigration checks, not through such repressive actions".

Since 2016, anti-LGBT sentiments are on the rise in the country, such as homophobia, hate crimes, raids, criminalization and harassment against LGBT locals and foreigners. The government's failure to curb Islamist attacks on LGBT people might damage the tourism sector and real estate development.

Regional conflicts 

Another major threat to the tourism industry are sectarian and separatist conflicts in certain provinces of Indonesia. Decades of separatism-related violence in Aceh ended in 2005 with the signing of a peace agreement between the Indonesian Government and the Free Aceh Movement. Currently, Aceh is trying to develop its tourism sector, although they still have problems regarding unconducive policies such as strict enforcement of sharia law that may harm tourism development in the province.

While the tourism industry in Maluku and Central Sulawesi, which have suffered in recent years from serious sectarian conflicts, are currently recovering.

Papua on the other hand, is still affected by Papuan separatism, a small scale regional conflict. The government and military has been accused of a "slow genocide" against native inhabitant, through transmigration from other densely populated Indonesian provinces that alter the demographic balance in the province. The government and military also has been accused for suppressing free speech in West Papua, after an expulsion of foreign journalists.

Environmental issues 

Environmental issues also pose some problem in the Indonesian tourism sector. Especially for nature conservation, marine, forest and national park-related tourism. Problems including deforestation, haze hazard caused by slash and burn practice that disrupts air transportation and health, also plastic garbage that pollutes marine life.

During tropical dry season in 2015, Indonesia and its neighbours were hit by a massive haze, caused by slash and burn practice to clear the land in Sumatra and Kalimantan (Indonesian Borneo). Riau was suffered the worst, as the haze disrupted air transportation and caused a health hazard.

In March 2018, a diver shows footage of a popular diving site polluted with floating plastic garbage in Manta Point, Nusa Penida, around 20 kilometres off-coast from Bali. Bali sits in the middle of the Indonesian throughflow, a current that streams from the Pacific Ocean into the Indian Ocean through the string of straits of the Indonesian archipelago. This means that plastic waste could either be local or brought in from as far away as the Pacific Ocean; either from within Indonesia, from neighbouring Malaysia and Philippines, or from far away Asia-Pacific region, carried away by sea currents.

Health issues 

An outbreak of bird flu throughout the country has affected the numbers of foreign visitors. As of 2006, the outbreak had killed at least 46 people since 2005, making Indonesia the country with the highest death toll from the recent epidemic. However, since the disease has not yet been proven to mutate into a form that can transfer from human to human, the US embassy, for example, has not yet issued a travel warning regarding the outbreak.

Due to the COVID-19 pandemic, Indonesia closed its borders to all travellers from China. This move has impacted the Indonesian tourism since Chinese travellers are the second-biggest foreign visitors to the country. The government is planning to spend $477 million in the form of tax cuts, discounts, and others to reduce the slump in the tourism sector. Foreign tourist arrivals at 3 (three) big gates from 26 main entrances in April 2020 compared to April 2019, namely: Ngurah Rai decreased by -99.94%; Soekarno-Hatta experienced a decrease of -99.79%, and Batam decreased by -99.27%. In March 2020, The Indonesian government has decided that Visa Free Arrival (BVK), Visa on Arrival and the Diplomatic / Free Service Visa policy are suspended for 1 month.

Guide books 

Guide books and travel accounts with details of the country and people have had a long history – some books from the 19th century and early 20th-century being classics with a description of places that were perceived as things to see. Both private authors and government publications (such as the 1920s Come to Java books produced in Batavia by the government tourist bureau of the time) have been made each decade through to the present.

There were restrictions to tourism during World War II and the mid-to-late 1960s – other than those two periods – travel accounts and guide books have been produced regularly. James Rush's and Adrian Vickers' texts mentioned below are excellent introductions to the range of writing that has been created.

The most popular guide book on Indonesia in English from the 1970s to the 1990s was Bill Dalton's Indonesia Handbook, while from the 1990s onward, the Lonely Planet's Indonesia went to its tenth edition in 2010. Many other guide books have been produced in English and other languages.

Major international newspapers regularly have travel sections and stories about Indonesia. The journalists of tourism in Indonesia joined in the Indonesian Tourism Journalist Association (ITJA), Indonesian journalists active enough to write a variety of tourism information about the uniqueness found in this country.

Gallery

See also 

 Alcohol in Indonesia
 Transport in Indonesia
 Visa policy of Indonesia
 :Category:World Heritage Sites in Indonesia

References

Further reading

External links 

 Indonesia's official tourism website
 Wonderful Indonesia online travel guide
 Indonesia Travel Wonderful Indonesia YouTube channel
 Indonesian Tourism Journalist
 Indonesian Travel information